The WWC Junior Heavyweight Championship is a championship contested for in the Puerto Rican professional wrestling promotion, the World Wrestling Council. While weight classes are generally not strictly adhered to in professional wrestling today, this particular championship is usually competed for by wrestlers weighing less than 230 lbs.

History
For a time, the title was defended in the W*ING promotion in Japan as the W*ING World Junior Heavyweight Championship. Originally, the title was used to push a wrestler that the promotion was interested in, becoming a stepping stone on the route to the WWC Universal Heavyweight Championship. A pattern was followed where these talents would win the Junior Heavyweight Championship first, followed by tertiary and secondary titles, before progressing to the main event.

By the 2010s, promoting up-and-comers became a secondary function, with the title now being used to appease journeymen and occasionally punish wrestlers that failed to draw. Independent wrestlers and veterans such as Tommy Diablo (Armando Gorbea) would exchange the title, which served as a perpetual card opener.

2017 international tours
After defeating Ángel Pérez to win the title for the first time and aware that it was no longer being used to push new or young talents, O.T. Fernández requested permission to take it abroad, citing interest in returning it to its original format and reputation by stating that he was "going to keep representing and showcasing the title with the best of [his] abilities [and that he wanted] to keep elevating this championship back to its old roots." In May 2017, he took the title on the Dragonmanía XII tour held at the Arena México, marking the first time in years that the title was exposed internationally, though it was not officially defended. On July 8, 2017, Fernández successfully retained the title over Aero Boy in a Cleveland Knights Championship Wrestling (CKCW) card held at Ohio.

His reign continued gathering outside exposition by making an appearance in a WAPA-TV comedy named "Such is Life". Fernández's successor, Ángel Cotto, continued the trend by defending the title at Chicago as part of IWC's Halloween In Your Face event, retaining against Julio "Vértigo" Rivera by getting himself disqualified.

Inactivity, IWA Florida (2018–2020)
After the title was quietly retired, the incumbent left WWC with the belt in his possession. On October 17, 2018, Cotto debuted in the rival World Wrestling League, where the fact that he never lost the WWC World Junior Heavyweight Championship was worked into a storyline that saw him challenge WWL Super Cruiserweight Champion Mark Davidson. On November 12, 2018, the actual belt made an appearance (as the "Puerto Rico Middleweight Championship") in a video announcing his arrival to IWA Florida, itself a spinoff of WWC's longstanding competition, the International Wrestling Association (IWA-PR). On December 7, 2018, the WWC World Junior Heavyweight Championship made its first physical appearance (though it was partially obscured) in WWL as part of Cotto's promotional skit for Black Xmas, where he felt short in his attempt to accomplish an extra-official unification.

On December 17, 2018, IWA Florida announced that he would be exposing the title in an open challenge at Histeria Boricua 2019. As part of that event, Papi Nieves won the belt and was attacked backstage. This led to a formal feud against Cotto. Nieves’ reign ended on March 16, 2019, when he dropped the belt back to its former owner at the IWA Arena. Cotto would then take it to Chicago, appearing in Global Wrestling Stars’ Noche Xtrema event. Even when entering a tournament for the IWA Florida Tag Team Championship, his incumbency as champion was emphasized.

When queried about carrying and defending the belt, Cotto said that he would return it to WWC if an “economic agreement is reached with Carlos Colón”. He continued being billed as the “incumbent champion” afterwards, making appearances in this role in August 2019.

Reintroduction (2021–present)
Following a nine-month hiatus caused by the COVID-19 pandemic, WWC announced that among the changes that would take place when cards resumed was a tournament for the World Junior Heavyweight Championship. This included the introduction of a new belt, to be awarded to the winner on January 31, 2021.

Title history

References

External links
Wrestling Information Archive 
Wrestlingdata.com

Junior heavyweight wrestling championships
World Wrestling Council championships
World professional wrestling championships